Marcos de Niza High School is a high school located in Tempe, Arizona. It was founded in 1971 and it has an enrollment of approximately 1,500 students. The school's mascot is the Padre.  The school is a part of the Tempe Union High School District and mainly serves students in central Tempe, as well as the Town of Guadalupe.

History 
The Tempe High School District hired the local architecture office of Michael & Kemper Goodwin Ltd. to design the new school. Kemper Goodwin along with his son Michael began drawing up plans for the campus in 1969. The school opened in 1971. Additions were made to the campus in 1974.

Athletics
State Championships
1980, 1986, 1989, 1990 - Girls' Basketball State Champions
 1990, 1991, 1992 - Boys' Soccer State Championships
1990, 1991 - Girls' Archery State Champions
1993 - Girls' Volleyball State Champions
1997, 2002, 2003, 2004 - Wrestling State Champions
1998 - Spirit Line State Champions
2002 - Boys' Basketball State Champions
2007 - Boys' Baseball State Champions
2008 - Girls' Golf 5A-II State Champions

Runner-up
1981, 1988, 1991, 1992 - Girls' Basketball State Runner-up
1992, 2003 - Softball State Runner-up
1994 - Girls' Volleyball State Runner-up
1996 - Wrestling State Runner-up
1997, 2008 - Boys' Volleyball State Runner-up
1998 - Baseball State Runner-up
1999, 2008 - Spirit Line State Runner-up
2007 - Girls' Golf 5A-II State Runner-up (Team/Individual)
2008 - Boys' Basketball 5A-II State Runner-up
2009 - Football 5A-II State Runners-up

Notable alumni
Marcus Brunson
Joy Burke, professional basketball player
Caleb Clifton, drummer for American metalcore band Eyes Set To Kill
Preston Dennard, NFL wide receiver for the Los Angeles Rams, Buffalo Bills and Green Bay Packers
Sam Dorman, three-time state diving champion, representing the U.S. in synchronized diving in the 2016 Summer Olympics
Adam Johnson, Pulitzer Prize winner, professor at Stanford
John C. Kilkenny, producer and Executive VP, 20th Century Fox Studios
Danny Martinez, wrestler; professional MMA formerly with the UFC
Carla Morrison
Mary Louise Parker
Douglas Razzano, figure skater
Frankie Saenz, professional Mixed Martial Arts fighter (UFC)
Columbus (Keith) Short, actor & choreographer (attended, but did not graduate)
Greg Vanney
Norifumi Yamamoto, wrestler; professional mixed martial artist,
N'Keal Harry, NFL wide receiver, for the New England Patriot's (attended, but did not graduate)
Derek Price, NFL Tight End, for the Detroit Lions (NFL)
Byron Murphy NFL Corner Back, Arizona Cardinals (attended, but did not graduate)

References

External links
Marcos de Niza High School
Tempe Union High School District
Arizona Interscholastic Association

Public high schools in Arizona
Education in Tempe, Arizona
Educational institutions established in 1971
Schools in Maricopa County, Arizona